Procyonidae is a New World family of the order Carnivora. It comprises the raccoons, ringtails, cacomistles, coatis, kinkajous, olingos, and olinguitos. Procyonids inhabit a wide range of environments and are generally omnivorous.

Characteristics
Procyonids are relatively small animals, with generally slender bodies and long tails, though the common raccoon tends to be bulky. 

Because of their general build, the Procyonidae are often popularly viewed as smaller cousins of the bear family. This is apparent in their German names: a raccoon is called a Waschbär (washing bear, as it "washes" its food before eating), a coati is a Nasenbär (nose-bear), while a kinkajou is a Honigbär (honey-bear). Dutch follows suit, calling the animals wasbeer, neusbeer and rolstaartbeer respectively. However, it is now believed that procyonids are more closely related to mustelids than to bears. Procyonids share common morphological characteristics including a shortened rostrum, absent alisphenoid canals, and a relatively flat mandibular fossa. Kinkajous have unique morphological characteristics due to their arboreally-adapted locomotion, including a prehensile tail and unique femoral structure.

Due to their omnivorous diet, procyonids have lost some of the adaptations for flesh-eating found in their carnivorous relatives. While they do have carnassial teeth, these are poorly developed in most species, especially the raccoons. Apart from the kinkajou, procyonids have the dental formula:

for a total of 40 teeth. The kinkajou has one fewer premolar in each row:

for a total of 36 teeth.

Most members of Procyonidae are solitary however some species form groups. Coati females will form bands of 4-24 individuals that forage together, while Kinkajous have been found to form social groups of two males and one female. Certain Procyonids give birth to one offspring like Ringtails, Olingos, and Kinkajous while Raccoons and Coatis give birth to litters that range in size from 2 to 6 offspring.

Evolution

Procyonid fossils once believed to belong to the genus Bassariscus, which includes the modern ringtail and cacomistle, have been identified from the Miocene epoch, around 20 million years (Ma) ago. It has been suggested that early procyonids were an offshoot of the canids that adapted to a more omnivorous diet. The recent evolution of procyonids has been centered on Central America (where their diversity is greatest); they entered the formerly isolated South America as part of the Great American Interchange, beginning about 7.3 Ma ago in the late Miocene, with the appearance of Cyonasua.

Genetic studies have shown that kinkajous are a sister group to all other extant procyonids; they split off about 22.6 Ma ago. The clades leading to coatis and olingos on one branch, and to ringtails and raccoons on the other, separated about 17.7 Ma ago. The divergence between olingos and coatis is estimated to have occurred about 10.2 Ma ago, at about the same time that ringtails and raccoons parted ways. The separation between coatis and mountain coatis is estimated to have occurred 7.7 Ma ago.

Classification

There has been considerable historical uncertainty over the correct classification of several members. The red panda was previously classified in this family, but it is now classified in its own family, the Ailuridae, based on molecular biology studies. The status of the various olingos was disputed: some regarded them all as subspecies of Bassaricyon gabbii before DNA sequence data demonstrated otherwise.

The traditional classification scheme shown below on the left predates the recent revolution in our understanding of procyonid phylogeny based on genetic sequence analysis. This outdated classification groups kinkajous and olingos together on the basis of similarities in morphology that are now known to be an example of parallel evolution; similarly, coatis are shown as being most closely related to raccoons, when in fact they are closest to olingos. Below right is a cladogram showing the results of molecular studies . Genus Nasuella was not included in these studies, but in a separate study was found to nest within Nasua.

 FAMILY PROCYONIDAE
 Subfamily Procyoninae (nine species in four genera)
 Tribe Procyonini
 Subtribe Procyonina
 Raccoons, Procyon
 Crab-eating raccoon, Procyon cancrivorus
 Cozumel raccoon, Procyon pygmaeus
 Common raccoon, Procyon lotor
 Subtribe Nasuina
 Nasua
 South American coati or ring-tailed coati, Nasua nasua
 White-nosed coati, Nasua narica
 Nasuella
 Western mountain coati, Nasuella olivacea
 Eastern mountain coati, Nasuella meridensis
 Tribe Bassariscini
 Bassariscus
 Ringtail, Bassariscus astutus
 Cacomistle, Bassariscus sumichrasti
 Subfamily Potosinae (five species in two genera)
 Potos
 Kinkajou, Potos flavus
 Bassaricyon
 Northern olingo or Gabbi's olingo, Bassaricyon gabbii
 Eastern lowland olingo, Bassaricyon alleni
 Western lowland olingo, Bassaricyon medius
 Olinguito, Bassaricyon neblina

Phylogeny

Several recent molecular studies have resolved the phylogenetic relationships between the procyonids, as illustrated in the cladogram below.

Extinct taxa
Below is a list of extinct taxa (many of which are fossil genera and species) complied in alphabetical order under their respective subfamilies.
 Procyonidae J.E. Gray, 1825
 †Broilianinae Dehm, 1950
 †Broiliana Dehm, 1950
 †B. dehmi Beaumont & Mein, 1973
 †B. nobilis Dehm, 1950
 †Stromeriella Dehm, 1950
 †S. depressa Morlo, 1996
 †S. franconica Dehm, 1950
 Potosinae Trouessart, 1904
 †Parapotos J.A. Baskin, 2003
 †P. tedfordi J.A. Baskin, 2003
 Procyoninae J.E. Gray, 1825
 †Arctonasua J.A. Baskin, 1982
 †A. eurybates J.A. Baskin, 1982
 †A. fricki J.A. Baskin, 1982
 †A. floridana J.A. Baskin, 1982
 †A. gracilis J.A. Baskin, 1982
 †A. minima J.A. Baskin, 1982
 †Bassaricyonoides J.A. Baskin & Morea, 2003
 †B. stewartae J.A. Baskin & Morea, 2003
 †B. phyllismillerae J.A. Baskin & Morea, 2003
 Bassariscus Coues, 1887
 †B. antiquus Matthew & Cook, 1909
 †B. casei Hibbard, 1952
 †B. minimus J.A. Baskin, 2004
 †B. ogallalae Hibbard, 1933
 †B. parvus Hall, 1927
 †Chapalmalania Ameghino, 1908
 †C. altaefrontis Kraglievich & Olazábal, 1959
 †C. ortognatha Ameghino, 1908
 †Cyonasua Ameghino, 1885 [=Amphinasua Moreno & Mercerat, 1891; Brachynasua Ameghino & Kraglievich 1925; Pachynasua Ameghino, 1904]
 †C. argentina Ameghino 1885
 †C. argentinus (Burmeister, 1891)
 †C. brevirostris (Moreno & Mercerat, 1891) [=Amphinasua brevirostris Moreno & Mercerat, 1891]
 †C. clausa (Ameghino, 1904) [=Pachynasua clausa Ameghino, 1904]
 †C. groeberi Kraglievich & Reig, 1954 [=Amphinasua groeberi Cabrera, 1936]
 †C. longirostris (Rovereto, 1914)
 †C. lutaria (Cabrera, 1936) [=Amphinasua lutaria Cabrera, 1936]
 †C. meranii (Ameghino & Kraglievich 1925) [=Brachynasua meranii Ameghino & Kraglievich 1925]
 †C. pascuali Linares, 1981 [=Amphinasua pascuali Linares, 1981]
 †C. robusta (Rovereto, 1914)
 †Edaphocyon Wilson , 1960
 †E. lautus J.A. Baskin, 1982
 †E. palmeri J.A. Baskin & Morea, 2003
 †E. pointblankensis Wilson , 1960
 Nasua Storr, 1780
 †N. pronarica Dalquest, 1978
 †N. mastodonta Emmert & Short, 2018
 †N. nicaeensis Holl, 1829
 †Parahyaenodon Ameghino, 1904
 †P. argentinus Ameghino, 1904
 †Paranasua J.A. Baskin, 1982
 †P. biradica J.A. Baskin, 1982
 †Probassariscus Merriam, 1911
 †P. matthewi Merriam, 1911
 Procyon Storr, 1780
 †P. gipsoni Emmert & Short, 2018
 †P. megalokolos Emmert & Short, 2018
 †P. rexroadensis Hibbard, 1941
 †Protoprocyon Linares, 1981 [=Lichnocyon J.A. Baskin, 1982]
 †P. savagei Linares, 1981 [=Lichnocyon savagei J.A. Baskin, 1982]
 †Tetraprothomo Ameghino, 1908
 †T. argentinus Ameghino, 1908

References

External links

 
Mammal families
Extant Burdigalian first appearances
Taxa named by John Edward Gray